Amarachi Uyanne (born July 17, 2004), popularly known by her stage name Amarachi, is a Nigerian teenage singer, dancer and violinist. She is best known for winning the maiden edition of Nigeria's Got Talent.

Background
Amarachi is a native of Delta State. She grew up in Edo State, where she started dancing at the age of 5. In 2012, she won a cash prize of N10,000,000 after she was announced as the winner of the first edition of Nigeria's Got Talent. She was subsequently dubbed the "youngest millionaire in Nigeria".

Education 
She attended University Preparatory Secondary School in Benin City, Edo State. The young celebrity recently graduated from secondary school in July 2019 and is currently a Student of Benson Idahosa University, Benin City, Edo State, Nigeria.

Career
After emerging as the winner of Nigeria's Got Talent, Amarachi released her debut single titled "Amarachi Dance". She proceeded to feature Phyno in a song titled "Ova Sabi"; her first two singles received massive airplays and positive reviews from music critics. She currently runs the Amarachi Talent Academy, a talent school conceived with the aim of nurturing and training young children with musical and dance talents.

Discography

Singles
 "Amarachi's Dance" 
  
 "Get Down"
 "Ova Sabi" (featuring Phyno)
 "Te Quiero"

Awards and recognition

See also
List of Igbo people
List of Nigerian musicians

References

2004 births
Living people
People from Edo State
21st-century Nigerian women singers
Nigerian child singers
Musicians from Lagos
Nigerian women singer-songwriters
English-language singers from Nigeria